Sierra Buttes is an  mountain summit located in the Sierra Nevada mountain range in Sierra County, California, United States. It is the third-highest point in Sierra County following the north ridge of Mount Lola and Peak 8740. Sierra Buttes are set on land managed by Tahoe National Forest and are within the North Yuba River watershed. The prominent fortress-like landform is visible from as far as the Sacramento Valley, and inclusion on the Sierra Peaks Section peakbagging list generates climbing interest. This landform's toponym has been officially adopted by the U.S. Board on Geographic Names, and has been in use since at least 1896 when published by the Sierra Club.

Lookout
A fire lookout tower that was originally built in 1915 tops the highest point on Sierra Buttes. In 1964, employees of the National Forest Service erected metal stairs with railings for the public to safely access the views from the lookout. The hike to the lookout is one of the most popular destinations in the northern Sierra region. The Sierra Buttes trail is 2.3 miles long, gains 1,587 feet of elevation, and one mile of it is shared with the Pacific Crest Trail. In good weather, Lassen Peak can be seen from the lookout, 65 miles to the northwest, as well as Mount Shasta 150 miles distant. Sierra Valley can be seen to the east.

Climate
According to the Köppen climate classification system, Sierra Buttes is located in an alpine climate zone. Most weather fronts originate in the Pacific Ocean and travel east toward the Sierra Nevada mountains. As fronts approach, they are forced upward by the peaks (orographic lift), causing them to drop their moisture in the form of rain or snowfall onto the range.

Geology
The Sierra Buttes are composed of metavolcanic rock, predominantly andesitic hydroclastic breccia and peperite which intruded the Sierra Buttes Formation. The rock is part of the Northern Sierra Terrane and was formed in an undersea volcanic process along an island arc during the late Devonian period. Gold nuggets were discovered at mines surrounding the Sierra Buttes during the California Gold Rush, the largest of which weighed 106 pounds was uncovered in 1869.

Gallery

See also

References

External links
 Weather forecast: Sierra Buttes
 Sierra Buttes trail: Hikingproject.com
 2022 fatality: sfgate.com

North American 2000 m summits
Mountains of Northern California
Mountains of the Sierra Nevada (United States)
Mountains of Sierra County, California
Tahoe National Forest